An obstruent is a speech sound such as , , or  that is formed by obstructing airflow. Obstruents contrast with sonorants, which have no such obstruction and so resonate. All obstruents are consonants, but sonorants include vowels as well as consonants.

Subclasses 
Obstruents are subdivided into:

Voicing 
Obstruents are often prototypically voiceless, but voiced obstruents are common. This contrasts with sonorants, which are prototypically voiced and only rarely voiceless.

See also
List of phonetics topics

References

 

Obstruents